Surfin' Guitars: Instrumental Surf Bands of the Sixties is a book by Robert J. Dalley which covers the instrumental side of the surf genre in the 1960s and looks at groups and artists from that era. It has been published three times with the first version published in 1988 and the third in 2015. It has been quoted and referred to multiple times in  books relating to surf music.

About the book
The book was originally published in 1988. It consists of 421 pages and is divided into 41 chapters and each chapter chronicles a music group. It also gives a discographical study on the bands in the chapters.

Author Dalley, himself a musician started out interviewing two former members of the group, The Surfaris. His reason for seeking them out originally was to find out how to re-create the surf sound from the 1960s. The taped interview developed info the basis of an article. This was submitted to the record collector magazine Goldmine. He became a regular contributor the magazine and was interviewing bands. Later he decided to compile a book with a thorough history on surf music. In hunting down info, he had to enlist the help of a private detective to track down a band that was hard to find.

Artists in the book include Larry Samson of Jerry & The Diamonds, Dick Dale, The Challengers and the Invaders. The book also looks at "reverb" use in surf music.

Editions

References

Surf music